Galearis fauriei is a species of orchid endemic to Japan (southern Honshu).

References

External links
 
 

fauriei
Orchids of Japan
Endemic flora of Japan
Flora of Japan